Shajapur railway station is a railway station in situated on Indore–Gwalior line in Shajapur district, Madhya Pradesh. Its code is SFY. It serves Shajapur town. The station consists of two platforms, neither well sheltered. It lacks many facilities including water and sanitation.

References

Railway stations in Shajapur district
Bhopal railway division